Dichomeris nonstrigella, the little devil, is a moth in the family Gelechiidae. It was described by Vactor Tousey Chambers in 1878. It is found in North America, where it has been recorded from Nova Scotia to Maryland, Michigan, Kansas, Arkansas and Kentucky.

The length of the forewings is 7–9 mm. The forewings are rich brownish purple. The hindwings are purplish brown. Adults are on wing from May to July.

The larvae feed on Aster shortii.

References

Moths described in 1878
nonstrigella